Barðsneshorn is the extreme end of Barðsnes in the east of Iceland. Barðsneshorn is 9.7 km to the north of Gerpir easternmost point of mainland Iceland.

Headlands of Iceland